The Second ministry of Yogi Adityanath is the council of ministers in headed by Chief Minister Yogi Adityanath, which was formed after 2022 Uttar Pradesh Legislative Assembly election which was held in seven phases during February and March in the state. The results were declared on 10 March and this led to formation of 18th Uttar Pradesh Legislative Assembly. The swearing-in ceremony was held at BRSABV Ekana International Cricket stadium, Gomti Nagar Extension in Lucknow. The head of all the big Indian and NDA lead states along with the big businessmen's including many celebrities were invited in the ceremony. 53 ministers (Chief Minister, 2 Deputy Chief Ministers, 16 Cabinet Ministers, 14 MoS Ind Charge and 20 MoS) were given oath by the Governor Anandiben Patel.

As per the Constitution of India, the Uttar Pradesh Council of Ministers, including the Chief Minister, can have maximum 60 members.

Council of Ministers 
Source:

Cabinet Ministers 

|}

Ministers of State (Independent Charge) 

|}

Minister of State 

|}

Former Ministers

{| class="wikitable sortable" style="text-align:center;"
|-
! SI No.
! Name
! Department
! Tenure
! Reason
! colspan="2" scope="col" | Party
|-
! 1.
|Bhupendra Chaudhary
|Minister of Panchayati Raj.
| March 2022 – August 2022
| Resigned. Made UP BJP chief.
|BJP
| bgcolor=#FF9933|
|-

Outgoing Ministers 
Sitting ministers Mukut Bihari, Swati Singh, Chaudhary Udaybhan Singh were denied tickets for contesting election.

Sitting Ministers who lost 
 Suresh Rana
 Rajendra Pratap Singh
 Upendra Tiwari
 Satish Chandra Dwivedi
 Anand Swaroop Shukla
 Ranvendra Pratap Singh
 Lakhan Singh
 Chandrika Prasad Upadhyay
 Chhatrapal Singh Gangwar
 Sangeeta Balwant
 Keshav Prasad Maurya

These are the Ministers which were the part of First Yogi Adityanath Ministry but were not included in Second Yogi Adityanath Ministry.

Dinesh Sharma
 Satish Mahana
 Ramapati Shastri
 Jai Pratap Singh
 Shrikant Sharma
 Sidharth Nath Singh
 Ashutosh Tandon
 Mahendra Kumar Singh
 Ram Naresh Agnihotri
 Neelkanth Tiwari
 Ashok Katariya
 Sriram Chauhan
 Jai Prakash Nishad
 Jai Kumar Singh Jaiki
 Atul Garg
 Mohsin Raza
 Suresh Pasi
 Anil Sharma
 Mahesh Chandra Gupta
 Girraj Singh Dharmesh
 Neelima Katiyar
 Rama Shankar Singh
 Paltu Ram

Satish Mahana was later elected as the speaker of the legislative assembly.

Demographics of the Council of Ministers 

The following table represent the demographics of council of ministers as per 10 April 2022.

NDA Cabinet by Party

District Wise Distribution

References 

Yogi II
Yogi II
Yogi 2
Cabinets established in 2022
Apna Dal (Sonelal)